Shundi is an Albanian surname.

People
 Stefan Shundi (1906–1947), Albanian literary critic, writer, and sports organizer
 Andrea Shundi (born 1934), Albanian-American agronomist
 Athanas Shundi (1892–1940), Albanian pharmacist and politician

Notes

Albanian-language surnames